Frank H. Bishop   (September 21, 1860 – June 18, 1929) was a 19th-century professional baseball infielder. He played for the Chicago Browns in the Union Association in May 1884. After his brief stint in the Majors, he played in the Southern League in 1885, the Northwestern League in 1886-1887, the Central Interstate League in 1888 and the Texas League in 1889.

External links

Major League Baseball infielders
Chicago Browns/Pittsburgh Stogies players
19th-century baseball players
Baseball players from Illinois
1860 births
1929 deaths
Birmingham (minor league baseball) players
Oshkosh (minor league baseball) players
Eau Claire (minor league baseball) players
Dubuque (minor league baseball) players
Dallas Tigers players